Boz Laneh (also Romanized as Boz Lāneh, Bezlāneh, and Boz Lānah; also known as Bij Laniyeh) is a village in Naran Rural District, in the Central District of Sanandaj County, Kurdistan Province, Iran. At the 2006 census, its population was 476, in 119 families. The village is populated by Kurds.

References 

Towns and villages in Sanandaj County
Kurdish settlements in Kurdistan Province